St Mary Redcliffe and Temple School (informally referred to as 'St Mary Redcliffe', 'Redcliffe' or 'SMRT') is a Church of England voluntary aided school situated in the district of Redcliffe, Bristol, England. The school was formed by a merger of Redcliffe Boys School and Temple Colston school; the former was founded in 1571. It provides education for approximately 1,600 students aged 11 to 18. The school's church is St Mary Redcliffe. It is the only Church of England School for the Diocese of Bristol. The headteacher is Del Planter and the Director of Sixth Form is Richard Wheeler.

History

St Mary Redcliffe School 
St Mary Redcliffe school was founded as Queen Elizabeth's Free Grammar and Writing School by letters patent on 30 June 1571 when it was granted a Royal charter by Elizabeth I. The charter granted the parishioners of St Mary Redcliffe Church the Chapel of the Holy Ghost for the establishment of the school; the building had previously belonged to the Hospital of St John the Baptist, a religious foundation in Redcliffe, but had been confiscated by the Crown during the dissolution of the monasteries. The building was located in the Churchyard of St Mary Redcliffe, near the south porch, and was sized 56 feet by 26 feet. The charter made the provision for one master and one under-master, supervised by twelve governors and for the 'education, teaching and instruction of boys and youth in grammar and learning'. It received an endowment from John Whitson in 1627. In the 1760s the school building was torn down as it was felt it spoilt the view of the church, and with the acceptance of the Bishop of Bristol, Thomas Newton, the school moved into the Lady Chapel in the east end of the church. The school was recorded in 1839 as possessing a statue of its founder Elizabeth I.The 1828 Charity Commission report inspected the school and found that there had been no free scholars on the schools foundation, and not more than one private scholar, since the appointment of the then current master in 1813; and conclude that the school had been of little benefit to the parish for over thirty years. They recommended that the school should be revived. The 1864 Schools Inquiry Commission, often known as the Taunton Report, inspected the school and reported that the Grammar School had ceased to have any visible existence, and the schools endowments from the Church and John Whitson were accumulating as there was no school or master for them to be given to. The report recommended that the funds allotted to the school instead be given to Bristol Grammar School.

In the latter half of the 19th century The Redcliffe Endowed Boys School occupied a site on the east side of Redcliff Hill in a mixture of individual buildings of varying age.

Temple Colston School 
Colston's Free School in Temple Street was founded by Arthur Bedford, the vicar of Temple Church in 1709. In 1711 Edward Colston endowed it with an annual fund of £80 for the education and clothing of forty boys of the parish and erected a schoolhouse. In an 1841 report of the Charity Commission the teaching provided was said to be in reading, writing, ciphering and the Church catechism. The school later opened to girls as well.

Merger of the schools 
Redcliffe Boys School merged with Temple Colston School in 1969, creating the co-educational St Mary Redcliffe and Temple school as a comprehensive voluntary aided school, and both moved to a new building at the current Somerset Square site.

In 2008, the school was awarded funding for a substantial rebuild of its main site, under the government's Building schools for the future programme. The construction company Skanska began work on 1 May 2009 and the new school was formally opened to students on 5 November 2010. Over the course of the 18 months much of the existing site was demolished, with new facilities being built to house science, mathematics, English, design technology, music, art photography and physical education.

The school's two mottos are "Steadfast in Faith" (historic) and "A Christian Community Committed To Excellence" (modern). Both reflect the partnership with St Mary Redcliffe Church, and also the official faith of the school. The earlier Redcliffe boys School used the motto "Prayer, Practice, Perseverance and Punctuality", known as the 4 P's.

Teaching and learning
SMRT has over 1,600 students, including approximately 580 in the Sixth Form (years 12–13).

GCSE and 'A' level examination results are generally above the national average. As well as achieving 'Specialist Humanities College' status, SMRT became a Beacon School in 2000, and has also been part of the 'Excellence in Cities' scheme, incorporating 'Gifted & Talented' programmes.

Academic achievement
The table below shows the percentage of students achieving the government's target of 5 A*-C including English and Mathematics.

Sixth form
Until 2005 SMRT's sixth form shared the main premises with the rest of the school. The Redcliffe Sixth Form Centre first opened in 2004, and is based in separate facilities on Redcliff Hill. However, some sixth-form lessons still take place in the main school, as this is where the main department rooms, such as the science labs, design technology rooms and music computer rooms and recording studio are.

School life

Houses
St Mary Redcliffe and Temple School has five houses. On entry to SMRT in year 7, students join Müller House (white), which is composed solely of Year 7 students. From year 8 to year 11, they are placed in one of the main four houses: Johnson (red), Franklin (blue), Liddell (yellow) and Equiano (green). These house names have been in use since September 2019.

The previous house names referred to William Canynges, local politician and benefactor of St Mary Redcliffe Church; Edward Colston, merchant, slave trader and founder of Temple Colston School; and J.T. Francombe, a former headmaster of the school and Lord Mayor of Bristol.

In the January 2019 newsletter the school announced the new house names as follows:

 James House became Müller House, named after George Müller, Christian evangelist and director of Ashley Down orphanage
 Canynges House became Liddell House, named after Eric Liddell, Scottish athlete and missionary
 Francombe House became Equiano House, named after Olaudah Equiano, African abolitionist
 Cartwright House became Franklin House, named after Rosalind Franklin, British X-ray crystallographer
 Colston House became Johnson House, named after Katherine Johnson, the African-American NASA mathematician whose calculations were critical to the first US manned space flights

The changes were implemented in September 2019.

School uniform
The school requires a school uniform for all pupils except those in the sixth form. The uniform is a black blazer, with the school logo, a "Redcliffe red" jumper (with or without sleeves), white shirt, black shoes, charcoal grey trousers and socks, and school tie with the SMRT logo; girls are entitled to wear skirts or trousers. In summer, students are not required to wear the blazer or tie, but they must still wear a jumper.

Facilities
Academic subjects are taught either in the main school building or the Ikoba (formally Temple Colston) Building (opened 1987). SMRT's on-site sports facilities include an indoor swimming pool, a new sports hall, a gym, an outdoor astroturf 'arena', now containing floodlights, which can be used by years 8–11 at break and lunch, and a new basketball and tennis court outside, which can be used by year 7s at break and lunch. Double P.E. lessons used to be held at The Old Redcliffians fields in Brislington, where they were used for football, rugby, hockey and athletics. The school now uses the South Bristol Sports Centre, in addition to holding some double lessons at school, in one of the sports facilities. The school's music facilities are of high standards, including a computer room dedicated for music, classrooms with 'pull out' keyboards and sound proof practice rooms with a working piano/keyboard in each. The music department also have a recording studio, although mainly used by years 11–13, and a recital room, which is a big room with a grand piano, drum kit(s), other percussion, and is used as a rehearsal space by students and ensembles and for small concerts.

Traditional events
Regular traditional events include House Eucharists and House services, beginning and end of term whole school church services and community coffee mornings. Annual events include a Remembrance Day service, Pentecost service, Leavers service and a Christmas carol service.

Admissions
St Mary Redcliffe and Temple School is the only Church of England secondary school in the Diocese of Bristol. It is a comprehensive state school and therefore does not select on academic merit. It is unusual, however, in that entry is not restricted by catchment area; the school serves both the city and the outlying communities of Greater Bristol, for which there are no alternative Church of England schools. It selects students on a range of criteria including church attendance, distance the student lives from school and if they have siblings who already attend the school. However, the school's administration also includes a small number of places for which no church link is required, which are intended for either those who are members of non-Christian religions, or who live within 500 metres of the school.

Within the student body, 10% of students have a language other than English as their first language, and 8% are eligible for free school meals.

The Governing Body
As a Voluntary Aided School the Governors are responsible for the creation and administration of the School's policy on admissions and for the maintenance and upkeep of the School's buildings, in addition to those matters set out by the 1986 and 1988 Education acts, e.g. curriculum, charging policy for educational activities, budget, access to information, employment of staff, standards of discipline, and sex education policy.

Governors' Management System
The Full Governing Body meets four times a year. The majority of the Governors' work is done through committees, which meet either three or four times each year. Disciplinary panels are convened as necessary. The Coordinating Committee comprises the Chair of Governors, chairs of each of the Governors' committees (including the independent Foundation committee), the Headteacher and Deputy Heads together with other School Leadership Team (SLT) members whose presence may be required. This Committee coordinates the work of the other committees and the Full Governing Body.

Members of the Governing Body
This represents the Reconstituted Governing Body (from 27 September 2018).

Governor Type Term of Office ends	 	Appointed by
Foundation	 	 	 	 
Claire Alsop *	 	to 31.08.22	 	        PCC
Karen Brown 	 	to 13.11.22	 	        DBE
Andrew Burton (Chair)	to 21.02.20	 	        DBE
Christina Cunningham	to 22.10.22	 	        DBE
Peter Farr (Vice-chair)	to 29.07.20	 	        PCC
Denise Nixon *	 	to 14.05.21	 	        DBE
Paul Sylvester	 	to 31.08.22	 	        PCC
Rev Daniel Tyndall	 	Appointed 20.05.13	 	Ex-Officio
Anne Vickers	 	to 04.10.19	 	        DBE
Martin Walker	 	to 19.07.19	 	        DBE
Greca Warr *	 	to 21.10.19	 	        Temple Trustees
 	 	 	 	 
Staff Governors	 	 	 	 
Elisabeth Gilpin	 	Appointed 01.09.05	 	Ex-Officio
Leigh Sims	 	        to 06.12.19	 	 
 	 	 	 	 
Parent Governors	 	 	 	 
Kim Cussans	 	        to 13.12.19	 	 
Rebecca John	 	        to 10.11.20	 	 
Hazel Nendick	 	to 15.11.22	 	 
 	 	 	 	 
Local Authority Governor	 	 	 	 
Vacant	 	 	 	 
 	 	 	 	 
Co-Opted Governors	 	 	 	 
Liz Thackeray	 	to 12.04.23	 	 	 	 
 	 	 	 	 
Associate Member	 	 	 	 
Cath Roberts	 	 	 	 
 	 	 	 	 
Clerk to the Governors	 	 	 	 
Sue Josham	 	 	 	 
 
 Also parents/carers of current students

See also
 List of the oldest schools in the United Kingdom

References

External links
 

Secondary schools in Bristol
1571 establishments in England
Educational institutions established in the 1570s
Church of England secondary schools in the Diocese of Bristol
Schools with a royal charter
Voluntary aided schools in England